Dichagyris lobato is a species of cutworm or dart moth in the family Noctuidae. It was first described by William Barnes in 1904 and it is found in North America.

The MONA or Hodges number for Dichagyris lobato is 10884.

References

Further reading

 
 
 

lobato
Articles created by Qbugbot
Moths described in 1904